Asociația Clubul Sportiv Fotbal Club Brașov – Steagul Renaște, commonly known as FC Brașov or simply Brașov, is a Romanian professional football club based in the city of Brașov, Brașov County, which competes in the Liga II.

The team was formed in 2021 in order to become the legal successor of the original FC Brașov, which was dissolved five years earlier. The new entity has permission to use the original club brand and is supported by the local authorities; however, it has a continuity issue and was directly enrolled in the Liga II on the berth of Corona Brașov, a former rival of the original club.

The Silviu Ploeșteanu Stadium has been the home ground of both the old and the new FC Brașov, and has a capacity of 8,800 seats.

History

Foundation and first years (2021–present)
The original FC Brașov was established in 1936 under the name of Uzinele Astra Brașov and made their debut in the Romanian league system in the 1939–1940 season, when it competed in the Brașov District Championship, finishing 3rd in Group 2. The club achieved promotion to Divizia B next season by winning the District Championship final, but the competition was postponed because of the Second World War. The original FC Brașov went bankrupt in 2017, after years of debts and a period spent in insolvency.

In June 2021, Corona Brașov, club owned by the Municipality of Brașov and newly promoted in the Liga II merged with ACS Scotch Club, an entity that took over "FC Brașov" brand with the help of the municipality, the owner of the brand following its acquisition in the liquidation phase of the old company. Corona ceased its place to a new entity called FC Brașov-Steagul Renaște and then disappeared from the map of Romanian football.

The move was strongly contested by FC Brașov supporters, known as The Flag-bearers, supporters that in 2017, immediately after the bankruptcy of FC Brașov (1936) made a phoenix club called SR Brașov, the club also fight for promotion in the Liga II and which was considered by the community the successor of the old FC Brașov. Supporters League also organized protests in front of the City Hall of Brașov and decided not to support the new FC Brașov, despite the original brand that it bears. They decided to continue their project, SR Brașov, name in which ironically SR also means Steagu Renaște (The Flag reborn), another reason for quarrel between the supporters and the Municipality, due to rights to the name.

The Romanian Football Federation announced before the start of the 2021–22 Liga II championship, that Brașov city hall, the owner of the logo, history and all of FC Brașov's football records, approves the use of these by FC Brașov (2021). A continuity problem still exists, due to the fact that FC Brașov (2021) entered directly in the Liga II on the old structure of Corona Brașov, rival club of the old FC Brașov (1936). Also the association of FC Brașov supporters is refusing to support the new entity and remained with their fan-owned football club, SR Brașov.

Grounds

FC Brașov plays its home matches at the Silviu Ploeșteanu Stadium in Brașov, with a capacity of 8,800 seats.

Support
The Flag-Bearers League Supporters (FC Brașov fans) decided not to support the new team, a team that was considered by them to be only a "political vehicle". Instead of FC Brașov, they will continue to support SR Brașov, a club founded by them in 2017, like a phoenix club of FC Brașov (1936).

Players

First-team squad

 (on loan from Kids Tâmpa Brașov)

Other players under contract

Out on loan

Club officials

Board of directors

 Last updated: 6 September 2022
 Source: Board of directors

Technical staff

 Last updated: 6 September 2022
 Source: Technical staff

League history

References

External links
 

Association football clubs established in 2021
Football clubs in Brașov County
Sport in Brașov
Liga II clubs
2021 establishments in Romania